89.3 LAFM (callsign: 7LAA) is an Australian radio station in Tasmania. Owned and operated by ARN, it broadcasts an adult contemporary format to Launceston and surrounding areas. First broadcast on 14 December 1930 as 7LA, the station currently broadcasts from studios in York Street, alongside sister station 90.1 Chilli FM. 89.3 LAFM also has a station in Scottsdale named 540 7SD which currently broadcasts on 540 kHz.

History
Established as 7LA in 1930, the station was formerly operated under various networks, including AWA Limited, 3KZ, RG Capital and Macquarie Regional RadioWorks. In 1978, the station shifted frequency to 1098 AM as part of a nationwide frequency move on the AM band, changing from 10 kHz spacing to 9 kHz.

In 2002, television station ABNT-3 vacated VHF channel 3, opening up space for further FM radio services in Launceston. In 2005, it was announced that 7LA, along with 7EX and ABC Northern Tasmania were to move to the FM band - 7LA on 89.3, 7EX on 90.1 and ABC Northern Tasmania on 91.7. In 2008, the station relaunched as 89.3 LAFM, with the AM service ceasing transmission in February 2009.

Today, the station networks the majority of its programming to Scottsdale-based 7SD.

In November 2021, 89.3 LAFM, along with other stations owned by Grant Broadcasters, were acquired by the Australian Radio Network. This deal will allow Grant's stations, including LAFM, to access ARN's iHeartRadio platform in regional areas.  The deal was finalized on January 4, 2022. It is expected LAFM will integrate with ARN's Pure Gold Network, but will retain its current name according to the press release from ARN.

On Air
Weekdays:
6:00–9:00   Jules For Breakfast
9:00–12:00  Mornings with Richard Perno
12:00–2:00  The Long Lunch with Shayne Brian
 
2:00–6:00   Afternoons with Fairsy
6:00-7:00   Jam Nation with Jonesy & Amanda
7:00–9:00   20/20 Retro Countdown 
9:00-10:00  The Christian O'Connell Show
10:00–6:00  Music Overnight 

Saturday:
6:00–10:00 Rotating Announcer
10:00–6:00 Rotating Announcer
6:00–2:00 Party On

Sunday:
6:00–8:00 Rotating Announcer 
8:00–10:00 Rotating Announcer
10:00–6:00 Rotating Announcer
6:00–12:00 20/20 Retro Rewind

2017 LAFM Number of Listeners:

Breakfast ( 5:30am-9am): 29,100  
Mornings ( 9am-12pm): 23,900  
Afternoon ( 12pm-4pm): 25,500  
Drive ( 4pm-7pm): 24,500  
Evening ( 7pm-12am): 4,100  
Weekend ( Sat-Sun 5:30am-12am): 26,100

External links
LAFM official website

References

Radio Heritage Foundation - 7LA Launceston - Reproduction of "7LA Launceston The Original and Feature Station, Broadcast Year Book and Radio Listeners' Annual of Australia 1946-47. Editor: C C Faulkner."

Radio stations in Tasmania
Radio stations established in 1930
Adult contemporary radio stations in Australia
Australian Radio Network